James Saunders (14 July 1946 in Wilmington, Delaware – 24 August 1996 in Cologne, Germany) was an American dancer, choreographer and movement teacher.

Personal life 
Born and raised as the son of Mary Lee and Major Saunders in Wilmington, Delaware, Saunders studied painting and sculpture at the Philadelphia College of Art (bachelor's degree). In 1968, at the age of 22, Saunders took his first dance class. and studied thereafter ballet with the Pennsylvania Ballet Company under the teachers Benjamin Harkavy, Edward Caton and Hector Zaraspe. He was later a student of Irene Bartos, Rosella Hightower and Anna Price. In 1973 Saunders left the United States and settled in Europe. Saunders had a fatal accident on August 24, 1996 during an upswing on a stair banister as part of his performance "Basstanz - Bilderwelten" which he performed with the musician Enrique Dias in the Museum Ludwig in Cologne. Saunders is buried on the Gracelawn Memorial Park cemetery Wilmington / Delaware.

Career 
Saunders was a member of the Pennsylvania Ballet (1972-1973), in Maurice Béjart's Ballet des XX. Century (1973), in the Tanz-Forum Cologne (1973-1977) and most recently in his dance cariere first soloist in the Frankfurt Ballet (1977-1980). He has danced leading roles in works by George Balanchine, Hans van Manen, Heinz Spoerli, Glen Tetley, Christopher Bruce and Talley Beatty.

After further educational training with Gabriela Taub Darvash in New York, James Saunders ended his solo career in 1980 and worked as a visiting professor at the Darvash School in New York. In the early 1980s he became artistic director of the Deutsche Ballett-Bühne e.V., the founding association of Ballet International magazine. In 1984 he founded the Tanzprojekte Cologne with Christiane Ruff and Kajo Nelles - Creativity through Movement. He brought amateurs with dancers and choreographers together on stage and worked with his holistic approach to art: everyone is a dancer, a mover. Thousands of people participated in those projects from 1984 to 1994. From 1985 to 1991 he directed his own dance training projects in-house, which contributed significantly to the development of a lively dance scene in Germany. From 1989 to 1994 he carried out the Creating Movement Projects in Johannesburg and Soweto a long term project supporting young leaders in the field of art. This was the first cultural project in southern Africa sponsored by the Goethe Institute. Beside his regularly teachings in his own studio (Tanzprojekte Köln) Saunders taught at Dance Institutes in Johannesburg, Soweto, New York, Jerusalem, Osaka, Arnhem, Vienna and he developed Solo works for himself and for dance colleagues. 1992 he became a member of the Board of Advisers of the "Soweto Community Dance Project". Saunders developed the "Body as Heart" exercises; a preparatory exercise series for dance training. After his death, BMW South Africa donated a scholarship for young African dance talents. In 1996 Saunders received the Cologne Dance Theater Prize for his life's work post mortem. Saunders estate is in the German Dance Archive in Cologne

Selected works 
 The unanswered question (1976)
 Animus (with a composition of Volker Blumenthaler, 1977)
 Horla (with Ilka Doubek, 1979) 
 Birds (with members of the Ballet Basel, 1980)
 Songs, 1991
 Aura (with body sculptures of Noam ben Jacov, 1991)
 Eye (with sculpture of Martin Schilken, 1994)
 Wanderer - Spaces like Home (with a composition of Mashiro Miwa)
 Basstanz ( with the musicians Jean-Claude Jones, Nicolaus Hoffmann, Enrique Dias and Peter Kowald, 1995/96)
 Observation Suite, 1996

Further reading 
 Kajo Nelles: James – Leben, Werk und Visionen des Tänzers, Choreographen und Bewegungslehrers James Saunders. Königsförde 1999, .
James Saunders / Kajo Nelles: Body as Heart - Übungen für Tanz und Alltag. Köln 1996/1997

External links 
 Biographie und Fotos, vom Deutschen Tanzarchiv Köln
 Literatur von und über James Saunders im Katalog der Deutschen Nationalbibliothek
 Tödlicher Unfall bei Performance. In: Neues Deutschland. 26. August 1996
 Videos von James Saunders
https://mobballet.org/index.php/2021/07/06/james-saunders/
https://de.findagrave.com/memorial/138649171/james-saunders%20Friedhof%20Gracelawn%20Memorial%20Park
https://de.wikipedia.org/wiki/Liste_der_Begräbnisstätten_von_Persönlichkeiten

References 

1946 births
1996 deaths
American dancers
American choreographers
Dance teachers